Karl Erik Harr (born 8 May 1940) is a Norwegian painter, illustrator, graphic artist and author, best known for his representations of Northern-Norwegian scenery and coastal history.

Background
Harr was born in Kvæfjord in Troms and studied at the Norwegian Academy of Art. He is  living in Kjerringøy in Nordland county, Norway.

Career
Since his debut at Statens kunstutstilling during 1967, his works have been presented at numerous separate and collective exhibitions. Harr has illustrated the works of Knut Hamsun. He has also made the indoor decorations for the Hurtigruten Coastal Express steamship Richard With.

Selected works
1973 Ytterst i verden
1974 Skarvene på Ut-Røst
1975 Nord i fjæra
1978 Nattlys
1983 Porten ved havet
1986 Sirilund
1988 Guds Nordenvind
1992 Der trollbåra bryt
1993 Den vakreste reisen
1994 Der skræg en fugl
1995 Malerier
1997 Fablenes farkost
1997 Draumkvædet
1999 Nordlandsbåten
2001 Dragsug
2001 Kunsten ombord
2001 Malerier av <=paintings by> Karl Erik Harr
2003 Vals i Concarneau
2003 Rotur i evigheten
2004 Hamsuns Nordland
2005 Morgen ved havet

References

1940 births
Living people
People from Kvæfjord
20th-century Norwegian painters
21st-century Norwegian painters
Norwegian male painters
Norwegian illustrators
Landscape artists
20th-century Norwegian male artists
21st-century Norwegian male artists